Reservoir station could refer to:

 Reservoir railway station in Reservoir, Victoria
 Reservoir station (MBTA) in Brookline, Massachusetts